The Toyota GR engine family is a gasoline, open-deck, piston V6 engine series. The GR series has a 60° die-cast aluminium block and aluminium DOHC cylinder heads. This engine series also features 4 valves per cylinder, forged steel connecting rods and crankshaft, one-piece cast camshafts, a timing chain, and a cast aluminium lower intake manifold. Some variants use multi-port fuel injection, some have D4 direct injection, and others have a combination of direct injection and multi-port fuel injection or D4-S.

The GR series replaces the previous MZ V6 and JZ inline-6, and in the case of light trucks the VZ V6.

Note: Power ratings have changed due to SAE measurement changes for 2006 model year vehicles. Toyota rates engines on 87 pump octane, Lexus rates engines on 91 pump octane.

1GR

1GR-FE

The 1GR-FE is the  version, designed for longitudinal mounting in RWD and 4WD pickup applications. This engine features Toyota's VVT-i, variable valve timing system on the intake cam and a compression ratio of 10.0:1.

Inside, the 1GR uses a "taper-squish" combustion chamber design with matching pistons to improve anti-knocking and engine performance, while also improving intake and fuel efficiency. Toyota adopted a siamese-type intake port, which reduces the surface area of the port walls and prevents fuel from adhering to such walls. This engine has special cast-iron cylinder liners cast into the block, which are a spiny type to improve adhesion between the liner and cylinder block. In the event of cylinder wall damage (scoring, deep protrusions, etc.), the entire cylinder block must be replaced. For increased block rigidity, the 1GR also receives a high temperature plastic insulator/protector, which fills the empty space between the outer portion of the cylinders and block material common to open deck engines. For increased cooling efficiency, the 1GR employs water passages between the bores of the engine. There are two such passages for each bank for a total of four. This reduces cylinder hot-spotting and keeps combustion chamber temperatures more uniform.

A bolt-on TRD supercharger kit was available on the Tacoma and FJ Cruiser but has been discontinued by Toyota.

The new 2015 Toyota HiLux receives a slightly different version of the single VVT-i engine, with the only change being a removal of an air intake baffle tank being replaced by a conventional air filter housing to intake pipe to surge tank style. The new intake pipe now contains resonators. Power output is unchanged.

First generation 1GR-FE variants with single VVT-i features Toyota's Acoustic Control Induction System. This system consists of a bulkhead to divide the intake manifold into two sections, and an intake air control valve (in the bulkhead) to control its effective length. When the engine is operating at moderate revolutions and under high load, an actuator closes the intake air control valve to increase the effective length of the intake manifold. 
At other operating conditions, the intake air control valve opens up to reduce the effective length of the intake manifold.

Applications with VVT-i (calendar years):

 2002-2009 Toyota 4Runner / Hilux Surf (GRN210/215)
 2007-2011 Toyota Land Cruiser (GRJ200)
 2002-2009 Toyota Land Cruiser Prado (GRJ120/121/125)
 2004–2015 Toyota Tacoma (GRN225/245/250/265/270)
 2005-2015 Toyota Hilux (GGN10/20)
 2005-2006 Toyota Tundra (GSK30)
 2006-2009 Toyota Tundra (GSK50/51)
 2005–2015 Toyota Fortuner (GGN50/60)
 2006-2009 Toyota FJ Cruiser (GSJ10/15)
 2009–present Toyota Land Cruiser 70
 2015–present Toyota Hilux

Applications with Dual VVT-i (calendar years):

 2009–present Toyota 4Runner (GRN280/285)
 2009–present Toyota FJ Cruiser
 2011–2014 Toyota Tundra (GSK50/51)
 2012–2021 Toyota Land Cruiser (GRJ200)
 2021–present Toyota Land Cruiser (GRJ300)
 2012–present Lexus GX 400 (GRJ150)
 2015–present Toyota Fortuner
 2009–present Toyota Land Cruiser Prado (GRJ150/150R/155)

2GR

2GR-FE

The 2GR-FE is a  version. This version features Toyota's Dual VVT-i, variable valve timing on both the intake and exhaust cams. The cams are driven using a timing chain.

Valves are driven by roller-follower rocker arms with low friction roller bearings, and a unique, concave cam lobe design to increase valve lift over the traditional shimless lifter type system of the 1GR-FE. This increases overall cylinder head height to accommodate the slightly taller roller rocker system. Moreover, the cylinder head is segmented into 3 parts: valve cover, camshaft sub-assembly housing, and cylinder head sub-assembly. As such, this valvetrain is used across all other GR engines with Dual VVT-i.

Applications (calendar years):

 2005–2012 Toyota Avalon (GSX30)
 2012–2018 Toyota Avalon (GSX40)
 2006–2012 Toyota Aurion (GSV40)
 2012–2017 Toyota Aurion (GSV50)
 2005–2012 Toyota RAV4/Vanguard (GSA33/38)
 2006–2019 Toyota Estima/Previa/Tarago (GSR50/55)
 2006–2011 Toyota Camry (GSV40)
 2011–2017 Toyota Camry (GSV50)
 2006–2012 Lexus ES 350 (GSV40)
 2012–2018 Lexus ES 350 (GSV50)
 2007–2009 Lexus RX 350/Toyota Harrier (GSU30/31/35/36)
 2009–2015 Lexus RX 350 (GGL10/15/16)
 2007–2016 Toyota Highlander/Kluger (GSU40/45/50/55)
 2007-2012 Toyota Blade Master (GRE156)
 2007-2013 Toyota Mark X Zio (GGA10)
 2008–2015 Toyota Alphard/Vellfire (GGH20/25)
 2015-2017 Toyota Alphard/Vellfire (GGH30/35)
 2008–2016 Toyota Venza (GGV10/15)
 2020–present Lexus LM 350 (Hong Kong only)
 2009-2021 Lotus Evora ( &  using Lotus engine management, Sport Pack package redline increased to 7000 rpm)
 2007–2016 Toyota Sienna (GSL20/23/25/30/33/35)
 2009–present Bolwell Nagari 300
 Toyota Corolla (E140/E150) (for Super GT use)
 Lotus Evora GTE (modified 4 litre version with  N/A for race use in the ALMS and at the 24 Hours of Le Mans)

Supercharged (calendar years):
 2007-2009 TRD Aurion (TRD supercharger)
 2009–present Bolwell Nagari 300 (Sprintex supercharger)
 2011–16 Lotus Evora S
 2012-2021 Lotus Exige S/350/360/380/410/430
 2017–2021 Lotus Evora 400
 2022 Lotus Emira

2GR-FSE

The 2GR-FSE is a  engine used in the Lexus IS, GS, Mark X and Crown and incorporates Toyota's latest D-4S twin injection fuel system. This system combines direct injection (/min injectors) with traditional port injection (/min injectors). Direct injection lowers the tendency to knock (detonation) and increases performance by reducing the charge intake temperature. Traditionally, direct injection engines require an in-engine mechanism such as swirl ports or specific piston crown shapes to increase air turbulence in the engine. These are in place to help achieve a homogeneous air-fuel mixture inside the cylinder at low RPM and high load, but these mechanisms inhibit performance at higher engine speeds. In the 2GR-FSE, port injection is used considerably to achieve the correct mixture without having in-engine restrictions, meaning the engine achieves specific power near the top of all naturally aspirated production gasoline engines in the world (/L,  in the Mark X). Toyota also developed a new type of injector for this engine. The dual fan spray pattern of the direct injectors is perpendicular to the piston travel with wide dispersion in the cylinder, which aids air and fuel mixture and therefore increases power and efficiency. The port injectors not only help improve the power and efficiency but they also help improve emissions, especially in the first 20 seconds after start-up (when the catalytic converter is in its warm-up stage). Compression ratio is 11.8:1.

The 2GR-FSE was on the Ward's 10 Best Engines list for 2006, 2007, 2008 and 2009.

Applications (calendar years):
 2005 Lexus GS 350 (GRS191/196)
 2005 Lexus GS 450h (GWS191)
 2005-2013 Lexus IS 350 (GSE21/26,  and  @4800 RPM)
 2008 Toyota Crown Athlete (GRS204)
 2008 Toyota Crown Hybrid (GWS204)
 2013-2015 Lexus GS 350 (GRL10/15)
 2013–2017 Lexus IS 350 (GSE31/36)
 2014-2017 Lexus RC 350
Supercharged:
2009 Toyota Mark X +M Supercharger

2GR-FXE
Atkinson cycle, VVT-i, uses cooled EGR system.

For the Lexus RX 450h, the compression ratio was 12.5:1. For the Lexus GS 450h, the compression ratio was 13.0:1.

Applications (calendar years):
 2009-2015 Lexus RX 450h, (GYL10/15/16), without D-4S (conventional multi-port indirect injection) 
 2010 Toyota Highlander Hybrid, without D-4S (conventional multi-port indirect injection) 
 2012 Lexus GS 450h (GWL10), with D-4S (both multi-port indirect and direct injection) 
 2013 Toyota Crown Majesta, with D-4S (both multi-port indirect and direct injection)

2GR-FKS
The 2GR-FKS and the 2GR-FXS selectively use direct and port injection. This engine first appeared in the 2015 Lexus RX350.

Applications (calendar years):
 2015–present Toyota Tacoma (GRN305/310/325/330) 
 2015–2020 Lexus GS 350 (GRL12/16) 
 2015–2022 Lexus RX 350 (GGL20/25) 
 2017–present Lexus LS 350 (GSF50)  (China)
 2017–2019 Toyota Highlander (GSU50/55) 
 2017–2020 Toyota Sienna (GSL30/33/35) 
 2017–present Toyota Camry (GSV70) 
 2018–present Toyota Alphard (GGH30) 
 2018–2022 Toyota Avalon (GSX50) 
 2018–present Lexus IS 350 (XE30) 
 2018–present Lexus ES 350 (XZ10) 
 2018–present Lexus RC 350 
 2019–2022 Toyota Highlander (GSU70/75) 
 2020–present Lexus LM 350

2GR-FXS
The 2GR-FXS is the hybrid version of the 2GR-FKS.

Applications (calendar years):
 2015–2022 Lexus RX 450h (GYL20/25) 
 2016–2019  Toyota Highlander (GVU58)

3GR

3GR-FE

The 3GR-FE is a  version with Dual VVT-i, designed for RWD longitudinal mounting. Bore is 87.5mm while stroke is shared with the 2GR at 83 mm, with a compression ratio of 10.5:1.

Applications (calendar years):
 2003 Toyota Crown (GRS182) (China, Asia-Pacific ex. Japan)
 2005 Toyota Reiz (GRX121) (China)
 2005 Lexus GS 300 (GRS190) (Middle East, Asia-Pacific ex. Japan)
 2007 Lexus IS 300 & IS 300 C (GSE22) (Middle East, Asia-Pacific ex. Japan)
 Hongqi HQ3

3GR-FSE
The 3GR-FSE adds D-4 direct injection.

Applications (calendar years):
 2004 Toyota Mark X (GRX121) (Japan)
 2003 Toyota Crown Royal & Athlete (GRS182/183) (Japan)
 2005 Lexus GS 300 (GRS190/195) (Europe & North America)
 2008 Toyota Crown Royal (GRS202/203) (Japan)

Supercharged
 2006-2009 Toyota Mark X Supercharged

4GR

4GR-FSE

The 4GR-FSE is a  version. This version also features Dual VVT-i, variable valve timing on both the intake and exhaust cams and an improved D4 direct injection system.

Applications (calendar years):
 2003 Toyota Crown Royal & Athlete (GRS180/181)(Japan)
 2004 Toyota Mark X (GRX120/125) (Japan)
 2005–2013 Lexus IS 250 (GSE20/25)
 2008 Toyota Crown Royal & Athlete (GRS200/201) (Japan)
 2009–2019 Toyota Mark X (GRX130/135) (Japan)
 2009–2015 Lexus IS 250C (GSE20)
 2012–2015 Lexus GS 250
 2012–2018 Toyota Crown Royal (Japan)
 2013–2015 Lexus IS 250 (GSE30/35)

5GR

5GR-FE
The 5GR-FE is a  version. This version does not include direct injection, but does include Dual VVT-i. The 5GR-FE engine is only built in China for vehicles for the Chinese market. Using the same bore as the 3GR-FE which is also built in China it can be built on the same production line, thus reducing production cost.

Applications (calendar years):
 2005 Toyota Reiz (GRX122) (China)
 2005 Toyota Crown (GRS188) (China)

6GR

6GR-FE
The 6GR-FE is a  version.

Applications (calendar years):
 2013 Toyota Coaster (GRB53) (China)

7GR

7GR-FKS
The 7GR-FKS is a  version.

Applications (calendar years):
 2015–2020 Toyota Land Cruiser Prado (GRJ152L) (China)
 2019–present Toyota HiAce (GRH300)

8GR

8GR-FKS
The 8GR-FKS is a  version.

Applications (calendar years):
 2017 Lexus LS 350 (GSF50)

8GR-FXS

The 8GR-FXS is a  version. The 8GR-FXS uses a similar fuel setup to the 2GR-FKS, combining the D-4S system and the simulated on-demand Atkinson cycle used in the 2UR-GSE and 8AR-FTS engines. The intake camshafts are equipped with VVT-iW and the exhaust camshafts are equipped with VVT-i.

Applications (calendar years):
 2017 Lexus LC 500h (GWZ100)
 2017 Lexus LS 500h (GVF50)
 2018 Toyota Crown (GWS224)

See also

 List of Toyota engines
 List of Toyota transmissions

References

GR
V6 engines
Gasoline engines by model